Krsto (Cyrillic script: Крсто), also Krste or Krǎstyo is a South Slavic masculine given name.

Krsto Papić
Krsto Ungnad
Krsto Zrnov Popović
Fran Krsto Frankopan
Vuk Krsto Frankopan
Krsto Hegedušić
Krste Crvenkovski
Krste Misirkov
Krste Velkovski
Krastyo Rakovski, a Bulgarian socialist revolutionary
Krastyo Krastev, a Bulgarian writer, translator, philosopher and public figure

See also
Krastyo Sarafov National Academy for Theatre and Film Arts
Macedonian Language Institute "Krste Misirkov"
Krstić (surname)

Croatian masculine given names
Bulgarian masculine given names
Serbian masculine given names
Macedonian masculine given names